Riquelme is a Spanish surname that may refer to:

People 
 Alba Riquelme (born 1991), Paraguayan fashion model
 Blas Riquelme (1929–2012), Paraguayan politician and businessman
 Carlos Riquelme (1914–1990), Mexican film actor
 Daniel Riquelme (1857–1912), Chilean writer
 Edson Riquelme (born 1985), Chilean footballer
 Isabel Riquelme (1758–1839), Chilean mother of independence leader Bernardo O'Higgins
 Joaquín Riquelme García (born 1983), Spanish viola player
 Juan Riquelme (1616–1671), Spanish bishop
 Juan Román Riquelme (born 1978), Argentine footballer
 Larissa Riquelme (born 1985), Paraguayan lingerie model
 Manuel Riquelme (1772–1857), Chilean military officer
 Manuel Riquelme (1912-unknown), Chilean Olympic cyclist
 Marcos Riquelme (born 1988), Argentine footballer
 Nemoroso Riquelme (1906-unknown), Chilean Olympic fencer
 Rafael Riquelme (born 1995), Mexican footballer
 Rodrigo Riquelme (born 1984), Paraguayan footballer
 Riquelme (Brazilian footballer) (born 2002), full name Riquelme Carvalho Araújo Viana, Brazilian footballer

Other uses 
 ARP Adolfo Riquelme, a gunboat in the Paraguayan Navy, later Tacuary
 Riquelme Point, a geographical point in the South Shetland Islands